Rutger von Langerfeld, or Rutger van Langevelt (15 February 1635, in Nijmegen – 15 March 1695, in Berlin), was a Dutch mathematician, painter and architect. He moved to the court of Frederick William (later king of Prussia) during the summer of 1678.

External links
https://de.wikisource.org/wiki/ADB:Langerfeld,_Rutger_van
http://www.deutsche-biographie.de/pnd119515776.html
https://eng.archinform.net/arch/108285.mobi.htm

German people of Dutch descent
17th-century Dutch mathematicians
Dutch painters
Dutch male painters
Dutch architects
People from Nijmegen
1635 births
1695 deaths